George Burrell (born 1892, date of death unknown) was an English professional footballer.

Burrell was born in Newcastle upon Tyne and played at outside left. He played initially for Shildon Athletic, South Shields, and Leyton before being signed by Woolwich Arsenal in 1912. He made his league debut against Newcastle United on 28 September 1912 and took over the outside left spot from Thomas Winship in a season in which Arsenal were relegated. In 1913–14, Burrell lost his place to Winship and only played six times. He was given a free transfer in the summer of 1914 and rejoined South Shields; in total he had played 24 games for Arsenal, scoring three goals.

References

1892 births
Footballers from Newcastle upon Tyne
South Shields F.C. (1889) players
Arsenal F.C. players
English footballers
Year of death unknown
Shildon A.F.C. players
Leyton F.C. players
Association football midfielders